Piryaloi is a small town of Khairpur District in Sindh province, Pakistan. The town is located on left bank of the Indus River near Sukkur Barrage. The main access to the town is through Sukkur–Pir Jo Goth road at Piryaloi Pul bus stop.

History 
Piryaloi, formerly called Piryanloi, means "land of the beloved" in Sindhi. The town came to be called so  after Syed Saleh Shah Bukhari Naqvi, a dervish of 17th century, inhabited this place and  the people of the surrounding area, out of love for this pious man, called his abode Piryan (Beloved) + Loi (Place).

Piryaloi is predominantly an agrarian town, where the main source of income of people is based on agricultural products. Date palms and mangoes are among the major products of the region.

See also 
 Khairpur (princely state)

References 

Populated places in Khairpur District